Anillodes is a genus of beetles in the family Carabidae, containing the following species:

 Anillodes affabilis (Brues, 1902)
 Anillodes debilis (Leconte, 1853)
 Anillodes depressus (Jeannel, 1963)
 Anillodes minutus Jeannel, 1963
 Anillodes sinuatus Jeannel, 1963
 Anillodes walkeri Jeannel, 1963

References

Trechinae